Leimaņi parish is an administrative territorial entity of Jēkabpils Municipality, Latvia.

Towns, villages and settlements of Leimaņi parish

References 

Parishes of Latvia
Jēkabpils Municipality